Distant Shadow is a 1999 film.  A thriller made in the UK, it is 100 minutes in length and was directed by Howard J. Ford.

Plot summary
Michelle witnesses the brutal murder of her mother while she is a four-year-old child. Sixteen years later she is still traumatized by memories, and living in poverty at a boarding house, struggling to pay the rent. She befriends a mysterious man who moves in across the hall named Charles Paskin. Something doesn't seem right about him and Michelle decides to investigate. She discovers that Charlie is working for the British government. His mission is to retrieve government files about a top secret operation which has been stolen, and he has been instructed to dispose anyone associated with these documents. Michelle believes that he may be connected with the murder of her mother. While trying to figure out the mystery, Michelle is dragged into a world of violence, conspiracy, and revenge where she soon discovers that nothing is as it seems and that no one can be trusted.

Cast
 Stephen Tiller  as Charles Paskin
 Rosie Fellner  as Michelle Wallace
 Trevor Byfield  as John Clay
 Andrew Faulkner  as Steve
 Terrence Hardiman  as The Svit
 Mark Little  as The Landlord
 Shane Richie  as Paul
 Mark Chapman  as Jimmy Scarface
 Gary Smith  as Deaf Nick
 Paul Maddocks  as Vince
 Gillian Tully  as Tina (as Gillian Tulley)
 James Healing  as Mike
 Andrew Pleavin  as Collins

External links

1999 films
1999 crime films
British crime films
2000s English-language films
1990s English-language films
1990s British films
2000s British films